Botoșești-Paia is a commune in Dolj County, Oltenia, Romania with a population of  986  people. It is composed of a single village, Botoșești-Paia.

References

Communes in Dolj County
Localities in Oltenia